Encore is a live album by American singer Lionel Richie. It was released by Island Records first on November 26, 2002 in Europe. The album features his May 2001 concert at Wembley Arena in London, as part of his tour in support of his sixth solo studio album Renaissance (2000). Most of the songs on Encore originate from previous studio albums as well as from Richie's repertoire with  his former band The Commodores, although he also performed the songs "Angel," "Tender Heart" and "Don't Stop the Music" from the Renaissance album

Upon release, the album earned a mixed response, with some American reviewers criticizing Island's decision to omit two previously unreleased original tracks, the Ric Wake-produced "Goodbye" and "To Love a Woman," a duet with Spanish singer Enrique Iglesias, from US editions of Encore. A commercial success, the live album reached the top ten in Austria, Switzerland, and the United Kingdom. It was certified double platinum by the British Phonographic Industry (BPI) and gold by the Swiss arm of the International Federation of the Phonographic Industry (IFPI).

Critical reception

Allmusic editor William Ruhlmann found that "Richie is an engaging cheerleader of a frontman, endlessly encouraging his already enthusiastic listeners with such interjections as "C'mon!," "Yeah!," and "Let's go!." [...] No doubt this show was more enjoyable for Richie fans in the arena than it will be for those listening at home [...] This is a performer who is playing much more to the audience in front of him than to the one that will hear the concert later on disc. Even leaving aside the truncated form of this version of the collection, this is not a memorable live album."

Track listing

Notes
 signifies a co-producer
 signifies an additional producer

Charts

Weekly charts

Year-end charts

Certifications

References

Lionel Richie albums
2002 live albums
Island Records live albums